An itinerarium (plural: itineraria) was an ancient Roman travel guide in the form of a listing of cities, villages (vici) and other stops on the way, including the distances between each stop and the next. Surviving examples include the Antonine Itinerary and the Bordeaux Itinerary.

Ancient practice
The Romans and ancient travelers in general did not use maps. While illustrated maps existed as specialty items, they were hard to copy and not in general use. On the Roman road system, however, the traveller needed some idea of where he or she was going, how to get there, and how long it would take. The itinerarium filled this need. In origin it was simply a list of cities along a road: "at their most basic, itineraria involve the transposition of information given on milestones, which were an integral feature of the major Roman roads, to a written script."<ref>Jaś Elsner, "The Itinerarium Burdigalense: politics and salvation in the geography of Constantine's Empire" The Journal of Roman Studies (2000), pp. 181–195, p. 184.</ref> It was only a short step from lists to a master list. To sort out the lists, the Romans drew diagrams of  parallel lines showing the branches of the roads. Parts of these were copied and sold on the streets. The very  best featured symbols for cities, way stations, water courses, and so on. The maps did not represent landforms but they served the purpose of a simple schematic diagram for the user.

The Roman government from time to time undertook to produce a master itinerary of all Roman roads. Julius Caesar and Mark Antony commissioned the first known such effort in 44 BC. Zenodoxus, Theodotus, and Polyclitus, three Greek geographers, were hired to survey the system and compile a master itinerary. This task required over 25 years. The result was a stone engraved master itinerarium set up near the Pantheon, from which travelers and itinerary sellers could make copies.

Vicarello cups
Archaeology has turned up some itinerary material in unexpected places. Believed to be a votive offering by merchants travelling from Gades to Rome, the inscription is a valuable source of information about the road network at the time, and scholars refer to this artefact as the Itinerarium Gaditanum. Similarly the Itinerarium Burdigalense (Bordeaux Itinerary) is a description of a route taken by a pilgrim from Bordeaux in France to the Holy Land in AD 333.

Other meanings
The term changed meaning over the centuries. For example, the Itinerarium Alexandri'' is a list of the conquests of Alexander the Great.  In the medieval period the term was applied to guide-books written by travelers, most of which were accounts of pilgrimages to the Holy Land.

See also
 Tabula Peutingeriana
 Periplus

References

Roman itineraries
Map types
Maps